The archerfish (spinner fish or archer fish) form a monotypic family, Toxotidae, of fish known for their habit of preying on land-based insects and other small animals by shooting them down with water droplets from their specialized mouths.  The family is small, consisting of ten species in a single genus, Toxotes.  Most species live in fresh water rivers, streams and pools, but two or three are euryhaline, inhabiting both fresh and brackish water habitats such as estuaries and mangroves. They can be found from India, Bangladesh and Sri Lanka, through Southeast Asia, to Northern Australia and Melanesia.

Archerfish or spinnerfish bodies are deep and laterally compressed, with the dorsal fin, and the profile a straight line from dorsal fin to mouth. The mouth is protractile, and the lower jaw juts out.

Archerfish are popular for aquaria, but difficult to feed since they prefer live prey.

Capture of prey

Archerfish are remarkably accurate in their shooting; an adult fish almost always hits the target on the first shot. Although it is presumed that all archerfish species do this, it has only been confirmed from T. blythii, T. chatareus and T. jaculatrix. This is partially due to their good eyesight, but also to their ability to compensate for the refraction of light as it passes through the air-water interface when aiming at their prey. They typically spit at prey at a mean angle of about 74° from the horizontal but can still aim accurately when spitting at angles between 45° and 110°.

When an archerfish selects its prey, it rotates its eye so that the image of the prey falls on a particular portion of the eye in the ventral temporal periphery of the retina, and its lips just break the surface, squirting a jet of water at its victim. The archerfish does this by forming a small groove in the roof of its mouth and its tongue into a narrow channel. It then fires by contracting its gill covers and forcing water through the channel, shooting a stream that, shaped by its mouth parts, travels faster at the rear than at the front. This speed differential causes the stream to become a blob directly before impact as the slower leading water is overtaken by the faster trailing water, and it is varied by the fish to account for differences in range. It also makes this one of the few animals that both make and use tools, as they both utilise the water and shape it to make it more useful to them. They are persistent and will make multiple shots if the first one fails.

During this learning period, they hunt in small schools. This way, the probability is enhanced that at least one jet will hit its target. A 2006 experimental study found that archerfish appear to benefit from observational learning by watching a performing group member shoot, without having to practice: However, little of their social behaviour is currently known beyond that archerfish are sensitive to, and make changes to their shooting behaviour, when conspecifics are visible to them. This is probably as a result of the potential threat of kleptoparasitism that other archerfish represent to a shooting fish.

An archerfish will often leap out of the water and grab an insect in its mouth if it happens to be within reach. Individuals typically prefer to remain close to the surface of the water.

New research has found that archerfish also use jets to hunt underwater prey, such as those embedded in silt. It is not known whether they learned aerial or underwater shooting first, but the two techniques may have evolved in parallel, as improvements in one can be adapted to the other.

Species

There are 9 valid species, 8 in the genus Toxotes:

Protoxotes lorentzi Weber, 1910 - primitive archerfish
Toxotes blythii Boulenger, 1892 - clouded archerfish, zebra archerfish
Toxotes carpentariensis, Castelnau, 1878
Toxotes chatareus (Hamilton, 1822) - largescale archerfish, common archerfish
Toxotes jaculatrix (Pallas, 1767) - banded archerfish
Toxotes kimberleyensis Allen, 2004 - Kimberley archerfish, western archerfish
Toxotes microlepis Günther, 1860 - smallscale archerfish
Toxotes oligolepis Bleeker, 1876 - big scale archerfish
Toxotes sundaicus Kottelat & Tan, 2018

Timeline

See also
Projectile use by non-human organisms

References

External links
 Archerfish Shooting Various Insects
 Archerfish capturing prey
 Guide to the Mangroves of Singapore: Archerfish
 Information and Photos on Archerfish
 Archerfish Can Adjust Their Deadly Shots Based on the Size of the Prey – LiveScience.com

 
Monogeneric fish families
Articles containing video clips
Taxa named by Georges Cuvier